S.O.N.O.G.R.A.M. is a 2005 album by American alternative hip-hop artist One Be Lo (Nahshid Sulaiman).  The album is entirely produced by the production team The Trackezoids (One Be Lo] Magestik Legend, Decompoze, and Chic Masters).

Track listing
 "Intro(1)"
 "The Underground"
 "Enecs Eht No Kcab"
 "Questions" (featuring Abdus Salaam and Charmaine Gibson)
 "Oggie"
 "Propaganda"
 "The Ghetto" (featuring Zo-Zer)
 "Axis"
 "Sleepwalking" (featuring Ka Di)
 "True Love" (featuring Decompoze)
 "Interlude"
 "Used 2 Be Fly"
 "Deceptacons"
 "Can't Get Enough" (featuring Magestik Legend)
 "Assassinations"
 "Evil of Self" (featuring Abdus Salaam)
 "The Future"
 "E.T."
 "The capital IST"
 "Rocketship"
 "Unparalleled" (featuring Magestik Legend)
 "Follow My Lead"

Album singles

Production 
 One Be Lo — track 1, 4, 6, 7, 11, 15, 19, 22
 Magestik Legend — track 2, 9, 21
 Decompoze — track 3, 5, 10, 13, 14, 16, 17, 18, 20
 Chic Masters — track 8, 12

2005 albums
One Be Lo albums
Fat Beats Records albums